The Steen Skybolt is an American homebuilt aerobatic biplane. Designed by teacher Lamar Steen as a high school engineering project, the prototype first flew in October 1970.

Design and development
The aircraft has a classic structure consisting of a welded tube fuselage and wooden wings, all fabric covered. It is a tandem open-cockpit two-seat biplane and is stressed for normal aerobatics. The cockpits are frequently constructed as a single tandem cabin with an enclosing bubble canopy. Some aerobatic competition aircraft are built as single seaters with the front cockpit closed off.

The original Skybolt had a  Lycoming HO-360-B1B engine, but powerplants of  can be installed.

Operational history
The Skybolt has become popular as an amateur-built sporting biplane, with over 400 aircraft having been completed from construction plans sold in over 29 countries. A Skybolt won the Reserve Grand Champion Custom Built for 1979 at the Experimental Aircraft Association airshow in Oshkosh Wisconsin. Sixteen examples were registered in the United Kingdom in January 2009.

Variants

Skybolt (S)
The standard Skybolt as originally released for home-building
Skybolt (D)
A revised structure and capability to have engines from  fitted.
Skybolt (R)
A radial engined derivative, with revised fuselage plus the improved structure of the (D), fitted with either a  Vedeneyev M14P or a  Vedeneyev M14PF nine-cylinder radial.
Skybolt 300
A derivative of the Skybolt fitted with a  engine.
Super Skybolt
A two seater version created by John Shipler by amalgamating a Pitts S-2 with a Skybolt, the prototype of which is named Storm Warning.
Starfire Firebolt

Specifications (Skybolt (D))

See also

Notes

References

External links

1970s United States civil utility aircraft
Homebuilt aircraft
Aerobatic aircraft
Biplanes
Single-engined tractor aircraft
Aircraft first flown in 1970